Ghassan Zaqtan is a Palestinian poet, author of ten collections of poetry. He is also a novelist, editor. He was born in Beit Jala, near Bethlehem, and has lived in Jordan, Beirut, Damascus, and Tunis. His book “Like a Straw Bird it Follows me” translated by Fady Joudah was awarded the 2013 International Griffin Poetry Prize. His most recent book of poetry, The Silence That Remains, also translated by Fady Joudah, was published in 2017 by Copper Canyon Press.

His name appeared twice among the short-listed award  winners of the  Neustadt International Prize for Literature in the years of 2014, 2016 by the University of Oklahoma, perceived as the American Nobel Prize. 

In recognition of his achievement and contribution to Arabic and Palestinian literature, Ghassan Zaqtan was awarded the National Medal of Honor by the Palestinian president.

Zaqtan, who is also the winner of the Mahmoud Darwish Excellence Award in 2016 (along with Lebanese Elias Khoury and American Alice Walker) was awarded Lebanese poet Anwar Salman's poetry award in 2019 at a ceremony held at the American University of Beirut, Lebanon.

In June of 2013, his name appeared for the first time among the speculation list for the Nobel Prize Literature for the fall of 2013. Ghassan Zaqtan’s work has been translated to English, French, Italian, Norwegian, Turkish, German, and other languages.

Early life

He was born in 1954. His father, Khalil Zaqtan, was a poet.
From 1960 to 1967, he lived at Karameh.
He graduated from Teachers Training College, Nu'ur, Jordan.
From 1973 to 1979, he was a physical education teacher.
He was editor of El-Bayader.
He was director general of Literature and Publishing Department, of the Palestinian Ministry of Culture.
He was the editor of Al-Shoua’ra from 2000-2004 and director of the House of Poetry.
Zaqtan writes a weekly column in Al-Ayyam newspaper.
His work appeared in Triquarterly. 
He lives in Ramallah.

Visa Controversy
In 2012, a reading at the New York State Writers Institute was canceled after visa delays.

In 2013, he was denied an entry visa to Canada.
After a protest by prominent writers, his visa was granted.

About Zaqtan's Poetry

“Reading Fady Joudah’s remarkable translations of Zaqtan, I was thinking of the great poet and mythmaker of Yugoslavia, Vasko Popa, who also saw violence and wrote the dream-time of his nation. Like Popa, Zaqtan is unafraid to claim his roots, but also to see the “secret builders Cavafy had awakened / passing through the hills,” digging by his pillow. For this bravery and lyric skill, I am grateful.”—Ilya Kaminsky

Griffin Poetry Prize 2013

Judges’ Citation
“What does poetry do? Nothing and everything, like air, water, soil, like birds, fish, trees, like love, spirit, our daily words … It lives with us, in and outside us, everywhere, all the time, and yet, we are too often oblivious of this gift. It’s a poet’s job to bring this gift out and back, this gift that makes us human again. And Mr. Zaqtan has done it. His poetry awakens the spirits buried deep in the garden, in our hearts, in the past, present and future. His singing reminds us why we live and how, in the midst of war, despair, global changes. His words turn dark into light, hatred into love, death into life. His magic leads us to the clearing where hope becomes possible, where healing begins across individuals, countries, races … and we are one with air, water, soil, birds, fish, trees … our daily words pregnant with beauty, and we begin to sing again till ‘ … the singer / and the song / are alike (Biography in Charcoal)’. This is Mr. Zaqtan’s only ‘profession’. It’s now also ours. About the translation: as a translator of poetry myself, I know the danger, frustration and the joy in the process of catching the fire from the original and delivering it through/into another language, another culture, another sentiment. Mr. Joudah delivered with such grace and power. My salute to Mr. Joudah, as translator to translator, as poet to poet, as doctor to doctor." – Wang Ping
- See more at: http://www.griffinpoetryprize.com/awards-and-poets/shortlists/2013-shortlist/fady-joudah/#sthash.hg6NWfAW.dpuf

Works
Poetry
•	Early Morning (1980)
•	Old Reasons (1982)
•	Flags (1984)
•	The Heroism of Things (1988)
•	Ordering Descriptions: Selected Poems (1998)
•	Not for my Sake (1990)
•	Luring the Mountain (1999)
•	A Biography by Coal (2003)
•	Like a Straw Bird it Follows Me (2008)
•	The Silence That Remains (Copper Canyon Press, 2017)

Novels 
•	Light Sky (1992)
•	Describing the Past (1995)
•	Old Carriage with Curtains (2011)

Plays Light Sky (2005)

Poetry Anthology

Le poeme palestinien contemporain (French Edition)

Works in English

References

External links

http://www.al-bayader.com/

1954 births
Palestinian poets
People from Ramallah
Living people
Place of birth missing (living people)
International Writing Program alumni